Shirley Washington is a television and film actress who appeared in television shows from 1970. She appeared in two episodes of Mission: Impossible playing a  Stewardess in the 1970 TV episode Flight and as a Travel Agent in the 1972 TV episode The Puppet and as Maggie in a Wonder Woman TV episode, "Chinese Puzzle". In the mid 1970s she starred in some Blaxploitation films as Mrs Jefferson in Bamboo Gods and Iron Men 1974, T.N.T. Jackson in 1975, as Theda in Darktown Strutters 1975 and in Disco 9000 in 1976.

Television 
The Redd Foxx Show - "The Old and the Restless" (1986) TV episode - Gina
Melvin and Howard (1980) - Patient Debbie
Police Woman - "The Inside Connection" (1977) TV episode - Bessie
Sanford And Son - "Aunt Esther Meets Her Son" (1976) TV episode - Salesgirl
Wonder Woman - "Women of Transplant Island" (1973) TV episode - Maggie
Mission: Impossible - "The Puppet" (1972) TV episode - Girl Travel Agent
Mission: Impossible - "Flight" (1970) TV episode - Stewardess

Film
 1977 Get Down And Boogie
 1976 Disco 9000 as Receptionist
 1975 Darktown Strutters as Theda
 1975 T.N.T. Jackson (uncredited)
 1974 Bamboo Gods and Iron Men as Mrs. Jefferson
 1973 Wonder Women

References

Reading
(Article) Black Stars"(USA) June 1975, pg. 32–35, by: Walter Jenkins, "Shirley Washington Tells How She Cracked Hollywood"

External links

Fandango

African-American actresses
American film actresses
American television actresses
Living people
Year of birth missing (living people)
21st-century African-American people
21st-century African-American women